Sals Creek is a stream in Scott County in the U.S. state of Missouri.

Sals Creek, originally called Salls Creek, has the name of the local Salls family.

See also
List of rivers of Missouri

References

Rivers of Scott County, Missouri
Rivers of Missouri